is an American football video game named after the television broadcast of the same name.

It was licensed by ABC Sports, but did not obtain an NFL or NFLPA license, and as such contains made-up teams, such as the Indianapolis Rays and the Miami Sharks, although their colors mimicked their real life counterparts.
Anaheim Turbo
Atlanta Monsters
Buffalo Cupids
Chicago Surfers
Cincinnati Dragons
Cleveland Warriors
Dallas Swimmers
Denver Snowmen
Detroit Bolts
Green Bay Armor
Houston Bisons
Indianapolis Rays
Kansas City Cyclones
Los Angeles Rockets
Miami Sharks
Minnesota Samurais
New England Cobras
New Jersey Olympians
New Orleans Tritons
New York Stars
Philadelphia Justice
Phoenix Fighters
Pittsburgh Belles
San Diego Spacehawks
San Francisco Honeybees
Seattle Ninjas
Tampa Bay Beasts
Washington Knights

See also
ABC Wide World of Sports Boxing

References

External links

Japanese-to-English Translations for Super Famicom games

1989 video games
American football video games
DOS games
Amiga games
Commodore 64 games
Super Nintendo Entertainment System games
Kuusoukagaku games
Data East video games
Monday Night Football
Monday Night Football
Video games developed in the United States